Carl Berner may refer to:

 Carl Berner (politician) (1841–1918), Norwegian politician
 Carl Berner (rower) (1913–2003), Danish Olympic rower

See also
 Carl Berners plass
 Carl Berners plass (station)